Zack is the surname of:

 Alma Zack (born 1970), Israeli actress
 Arnold M. Zack (born 1931), American arbitrator and mediator of labor management disputes
 Darren Zack (born 1960), Canadian Ojibwa softball player
 Eddie Zack (1922–2002), American country music singer, guitarist and songwriter
 Léon Zack (1892–1980), Russian-born French painter and sculptor
 Joseph Zack (1898–1963), Austrian-born American communist and anti-communist
 Maya Zack (born 1976), Israeli artist and filmmaker
 Naomi Zack, professor of philosophy at the University of Oregon
 Raymond Zack (c. 1958–2011), a man who died while police and firefighters did nothing to save him 
 Sally Zack (born 1962), American road cyclist
 Stephen Zack (born 1992), American basketball player

See also
 Zach (surname)